Alexander Mattison (born June 19, 1998) is an American football running back for the Minnesota Vikings of the National Football League (NFL). He played college football at Boise State and was drafted by the Vikings in the third round, 102nd overall of the 2019 NFL Draft.

Early years
Mattison attended San Bernardino High School in San Bernardino, California, where he played high school football. He rushed for over 2,000 yards in each of his final two seasons, going for 2,017 yards and 26 touchdowns as a junior and 2,057 yards and 22 touchdowns as a senior in 2015. Mattison was selected to play in the Inland Valley Football Classic following his senior season. In addition to football, Mattison also ran track and wrestled. As a senior, he won the Mountain Valley League title in the 110 meters hurdles. His personal-bests are 14.95 seconds in the 110m hurdles, 11.34 in the 100 meters, 23.34 in the 200 meters, 22'9" (6.93m) in the long jump and 46'5.5" (14.16m) in the shot put. He also won a league wrestling title at 195 pounds and was named all-league as a junior. He committed to Boise State University to play college football.

College career
As a true freshman at Boise State in 2016, Mattison appeared in all 13 games and had 328 yards on 67 carries with four touchdowns. As a sophomore he played in all 14 games, rushing for 1,086 yards on 212 carries and 12 touchdowns. As a junior in 2018, he rushed for 1,415 yards on 302 carries with 17 touchdowns in 13 games. He was the Offensive MVP of the 2018 Mountain West Conference Football Championship Game after rushing for 200 yards and a touchdown.

After the season, Mattison entered the 2019 NFL Draft. He cited his reason that "You can only play as long as your body lets you, and at this position, you can't assume it'll last forever." Mattison didn't miss a game in his college career despite needing offseason surgeries on his shoulder and ankle.

Professional career

The Minnesota Vikings selected Mattison in the third round with the 102nd overall pick in the 2019 NFL Draft. He made his NFL debut in the 2019 regular season opener against the Atlanta Falcons. He had nine carries for 49 yards in the 28–12 victory. In Week 3 against the Oakland Raiders, Mattison rushed 12 times for 58 yards and his first career rushing touchdown as the Vikings won 34–14. Overall, he finished his rookie season with 462 rushing yards and a rushing touchdown.

On October 11, 2020, during Sunday Night Football against the Seattle Seahawks in Week 5, Mattison finished with 20 carries for 112 rushing yards as the Vikings lost 26–27. Dalvin Cook was injured in the game, allowing Mattison the rushing opportunities for his first game with at least 100 rushing yards as a professional.

Personal life
Mattison is a Christian. He is fluent in Spanish.

References

External links
 Minnesota Vikings bio
 Boise State Broncos bio

1998 births
Living people
Sportspeople from San Bernardino, California
Players of American football from California
American football running backs
Boise State Broncos football players
Minnesota Vikings players